Cecil Closenberg (27 August 1907 – 9 October 1985) was a South African cricketer. He played in 22 first-class matches for Border and Eastern Province from 1926/27 to 1937/38.

Closenberg was an opening bowler. His best first-class figures were 5 for 47 for Border in their victory over Eastern Province in December 1934.

Closenberg died on 9 October 1985. He is buried in the Jewish cemetery at Pinelands, Cape Town.

References

External links
 

1907 births
1985 deaths
South African cricketers
Border cricketers
Eastern Province cricketers
People from Brakpan
Jewish cricketers